MTV Party To Go Volume 2 was the second album in the MTV Party To Go series.  The album was certified gold on August 19, 1992 and platinum on May 25, 1994 by the RIAA.

Track listing
 "Sadeness Part 1" (Extended Trance Mix) – Enigma
 "Set Adrift on Memory Bliss" (Extended Mix) – P.M. Dawn
 "Summertime" (Extended Club Mix) – DJ Jazzy Jeff & The Fresh Prince
 "O.P.P." (Ultimix Remix) – Naughty by Nature
 "Playground" (Young Jack Club 12" Mix) – Another Bad Creation
 "Motownphilly" (LP Version) – Boyz II Men
 "All 4 Love" (LP Version) – Color Me Badd
 "Let's Talk About Sex" (Original Recipe Club Mix) – Salt-N-Pepa
 "Here We Go Let's Rock & Roll" (Clivilles & Cole Rockin' in 91 Mix) – C+C Music Factory
 "Now That We Found Love" (Club Version) – Heavy D. & The Boyz
 "Good Vibrations" (Ultimix Remix) – Marky Mark and the Funky Bunch featuring Loleatta Holloway
 "3 AM Eternal" (Live at the SSL Extended Mix) – The KLF

References

MTV series albums
1992 compilation albums
Dance music compilation albums
Tommy Boy Records compilation albums